Abu Ya`qub Yusuf or Yusuf I ( Abū Ya‘qūb Yūsuf; 1135 – 14 October 1184) was the second Almohad Amir or caliph. He reigned from 1163 until 1184 in Marrakesh. He was responsible for the construction of the Giralda in Seville, which was part of a new grand mosque.
He was a keen student of philosophy and patron of Averroes.

Life
Yusuf was the son of Abd al-Mu'min, the first caliph of the Almohad dynasty. His mother was Safiyya bint Abi Imran, a masmuda woman from Tinmel, the daughter of Abu Imran Musa ibn Sulayman al-Kafif, a companion of Ibn Tumart. Like a number of Almohad rulers, Yusuf favored the Zahirite or literalist school of Muslim jurisprudence and was a religious scholar in his own right. He was said to have memorized Sahih Bukhari and Sahih Muslim, two collections of Muhammad's statements considered canonical in Sunni Islam, by heart, and was a patron of the theologians of his era. Respected men of letters such as Ibn Rushd and Ibn Tufayl were entertained at his court. Yusuf favored Cordoban polymath Ibn Maḍāʾ as his chief judge; during the Almohad reforms, the two oversaw the banning of any religious material written by non-Zahirites. Yusuf's son al-Mansur would eventually take the reforms even further, actually burning non-Zahirite books instead of merely banning them.

In 1170 he invaded Iberia, conquering al-Andalus and ravaging Valencia and Catalonia. The following year he established himself in Seville. He ordered the construction of numerous buildings, such as the Alcazar, the Buhaira palace and the fortress of Alcalá de Guadaíra.

Abu Ya'qub Yusuf was wounded at the Siege of Santarém (1184), in which he died on the road to Seville, near Évora. His body was sent from Seville to Tinmel where he was buried.

References

1135 births
1184 deaths
12th-century Almohad caliphs
People from Tinmel
People from Marrakesh
12th-century Berber people